The Midwestern Governors Association (MGA) is a 501(c)(3) nonprofit, nonpartisan organization that brings together the governors of Midwestern states to work cooperatively on public policy issues of significance to the region. The MGA was created in December 1962, when articles of organization were adopted at the first annual meeting in Chicago. The members of the association are the governors of Illinois, Indiana, Iowa, Kansas, Michigan, Minnesota, Missouri, Nebraska, North Dakota, Ohio, South Dakota and Wisconsin.

The purpose of the MGA is "to foster regional development, to attain greater efficiency in state administration, to facilitate interstate cooperation and improve intergovernmental relationships, and to provide a medium for the exchange of views and experiences on subjects of general importance to the people of the Midwestern states." In pursuit of these objectives, the MGA has, through the years, established a wide array of committees, task forces and study groups charged with investigating and reporting on various issues of regional concern.

The MGA staff supports projects undertaken by the governors and by the MGA working groups to promote regional cooperation and problem-solving. These multi-state groups of government officials work to enhance economic development in the Midwestern states and identify opportunities at the federal level to advance the MGA's goals. Issues they have recently addressed include agriculture, economic development, energy, and promoting Midwestern Successes.

The MGA also has Gold and Silver business partners, corresponding to the different contribution and benefit levels.

List of current Midwestern governors

The current MGA chair is Governor Tim Walz of Minnesota. His agenda focuses on preparing Midwestern communities for power plant closures.

MGA's past leadership 
 2019-2020 Chair: Iowa Governor Kim Reynolds 
 2018 Chair: Ohio Governor John Kasich
 2017 Chair: Wisconsin Governor Scott Walker
 2015-2016 Chair: Kansas Governor Sam Brownback
 2014 Chair: Wisconsin Governor Scott Walker
 2013 Chair: Minnesota Governor Mark Dayton
 2012 Chair: Iowa Governor Terry Branstad
 2011 Chair: Illinois Governor Pat Quinn
 2010 Chair: Ohio Governor Ted Strickland
 2009 Chair: Michigan Governor Jennifer Granholm
 2008 Chair: South Dakota Governor Michael Rounds
 2007 Chair: Wisconsin Governor Jim Doyle
 2006 Chair: Minnesota Governor Tim Pawlenty

External links
MGA website

State governors of the United States
1962 establishments in Illinois
Government-related professional associations in the United States
Organizations established in 1962
Midwestern United States